The .41 Short Colt cartridge was created in 1873 for Colt's single-action "New Line" revolver.

History and description
This revolver cartridge was introduced to the American market for the New Line S A. revolver in 1873. The cartridge has a larger edge diameter than the cartridges of newer designs for trigger-tension revolvers. It can be used in these weapons, but it is necessary to charge every other chamber. After the introduction of revolvers with trigger tensioning, the production of this cartridge was terminated. The .41 Short Colt could be used in revolvers chambered for .41 Long Colt interchangeably. Both cartridges originally had an outside lubricated bullet with a small diameter heel fitting the neck of the case.

Dimensions

See also
10 mm caliber
Colt Model 1877
.45 Colt
.45 Schofield
.41 Short
.32 Long Colt
.38 Short Colt
.38 Long Colt
.44 Colt
.41 Magnum
.41 Special
List of handgun cartridges

References

External links

 .41 Short Colt Single Action
 The SAA's Most Prominent Calibers
 AMERICAN-BRITISH PISTOL  41 to 80 caliber 
 The .41 Short Short and .41 Short Long and...

41 Short Colt
Colt cartridges